Claire Keane (born March 1, 1979) is an author and illustrator and visual development artist who contributed to the Disney films Enchanted, Tangled, Wreck-It Ralph and Frozen. She is the daughter of Disney animator Glen Keane and the granddaughter of cartoonist Bil Keane, creator of the comic strip, The Family Circus and Thelma Keane.

Early life 
Keane grew up in California until, at the age of 16, she and her family moved to France. There she attended the American School of Paris and the Paris outpost of the Parsons School of Design. Keane then studied at the École supérieure des arts graphiques in Paris. She was encouraged to become a graphic designer. However, she realized that she preferred developing and exploring visuals and stories. Her father Glen Keane was just starting to develop the story of Tangled and told her they would soon need a visual development artist. Keane and her husband moved to Los Angeles where she worked at Disney Feature Animation for ten years designing for Tangled, Frozen and Enchanted among other films. In 2012, she left to work independently. Keane's first children's book Once Upon A Cloud came out in 2015 and her second book, Little Big Girl was published in the fall of 2016.

Career 
As a conceptual artist during the production of Tangled, Keane's work spanned the visual development seen throughout the entire film, but her work was arguably most visible as the murals the character Rapunzel paints on the wall of her home. For these, Keane hand painted the mural on a wall in the art department of the Walt Disney Animation Studios. Keane also illustrated the Disney storybook, Rapunzel's Amazing Hair. In 2020, she won an Emmy Award for her work on Tangled The Series.

For Enchanted, Keane worked with costume designer Mona May to help realize Giselle's dresses. In 2013, Keane left Disney to focus on writing and illustrating children's books. She released her first illustrated children's book: Once Upon A Cloud, which Kirkus Reviews felt displayed her background in working for Disney. Little Big Girl has a "retro" look to the illustrations.

The Cape Cod Times wrote that Keane's illustrations are a good match for Diane Adams' text in Love Is.

Filmography

Books

References

External links 

 Official website 
 “Interview With Claire Keane” on YouTube
 Claireonacloud. "Claire Keane." Claire Keane, claireonacloud.tumblr.com/. Accessed April 27, 2017.
 

1979 births
Living people
21st-century American women artists
American illustrators
École nationale supérieure des arts décoratifs alumni
Daytime Emmy Award winners
Walt Disney Animation Studios people
Writers who illustrated their own writing